Government Serchhip College is a government college in Serchhip Town in the Indian state of Mizoram. The College is affiliated to Mizoram University. It is accredited with an A grade by NAAC. Serchhip College at present has 405 students.

History
Govt Serchhip College is an outcome of the joint venture of Serchhip and Chhiahtlang people and was established on 25 August 1973 by former Chief Minister Ch. Chhunga. In 1975, it was given affiliation by North Eastern Hill University and subsequently to Mizoram University in 2001. The College has also been placed under section 2(f) and 12(B) of the UGC Act, 1956 vide letter No.F.No.8-93/86 (CPP-1) dt. 27. 10. 1990.

Departments
Starting with Arts Faculty comprising only five Departments in 1973, the number of department had now increased to fourteen with Science stream introduced in 1998. The college now has 14 departments, which are constituents of two faculties – Arts and Science.
The college offers the following degrees.
 Bachelor of Arts 
 Bachelor of Science
 Bachelor of Computer Application

References

External links 
Government Serchhip College Official Website

Universities and colleges in Mizoram
Colleges affiliated to Mizoram University
Serchhip